Heliotropium argenteum is a species of plant in the family Boraginaceae. It is endemic to Ecuador.  Its natural habitat is subtropical or tropical dry shrubland. It is threatened by habitat loss.

References

Flora of Ecuador
argenteum
Vulnerable plants
Taxonomy articles created by Polbot